Hermes, in comics, may refer to:

 Hermes (Marvel Comics), a Marvel Comics character
 Hermes (DC Comics), a DC Comics character connected to Captain Marvel
 Hermes Conrad, a character who has appeared in Futurama Comics

References

See also
Hermes (disambiguation)
Mercury (comics), as Mercury is the Roman name for the same god